Revd Joshua Roy Porter (1921–2006) was a British theologian and author.

Early life and education 
Porter was born on 7 May 1921 in Macclesfield, Cheshire, to Joshua Porter and Bessie Evelyn (nee Earlam). He attended King's School, Macclesfield before studying at Merton College, Oxford, where he graduated with a double first in Modern History and Theology in 1942. He then trained for the priesthood at St Stephen’s House, Oxford, and went on to become curate at St Mary’s, Portsea.

University career 
In 1949 Porter returned to Oxford, to Oriel College, where for the next thirteen years he held positions as Fellow, Chaplain and lecturer. In 1962 Porter joined the University of Exeter, to the newly-created Chair of Theology.  Porter served as Professor until 1986 (and also as Dean of Arts from 1968 to 1971). As a scholar, Porter’s focus was the Old Testament.

Church of England 
Porter served as a member of the Church of England Synod from 1970 to 1990. A conservative thinker, he opposed liberalizing changes to the Church of England (such as the ordination of women).

Folklore 
Porter also had an interest in folklore and served as President of the Folklore Society from 1976 to 1979. His three Presidential addresses were titled, 'Two Presidents of the Folklore Society: S. H. Hooke and E. O. James' (1977), “The Daughters of Lot' (1978), and 'Folklore Between the Testaments' (1979)

Selected works 

 Porter, J. R. (1963). Moses and monarchy: a study in the Biblical tradition of Moses. Inaugural lecture of the Chair of Theology in the University of Exeter delivered on 26 February 1963. Oxford: Blackwell. OCLC 1152653198.
 Porter, J. R. (1976).The Book of Leviticus. Cambridge: Cambridge University Press. . OCLC 59166428.
 Porter, J. R. (1999) Jesus Christ: The Jesus of History, the Christ of Faith. New York: Oxford University Press. . OCLC 232163064.
 Porter, J. R. (2003) The new illustrated companion to the Bible: Old Testament, New Testament, the life of Jesus, early Christianity, Jesus in art. London: Duncan Baird.. OCLC 52784359.
Service delivered by Porter at the Southeastern Baptist Theological Seminary in 1964.

References 

20th-century British theologians
British folklorists
1921 births
2006 deaths
Presidents of the Folklore Society
Alumni of Merton College, Oxford
Alumni of Oriel College, Oxford